Alexandre Roger Oukidja (born 19 July 1988) is an Algerian professional footballer who plays as a goalkeeper for  club Metz and Algeria national football team.

Club career
Oukidja made his professional debut in the 2005–06 season in Ligue 2 for Gueugnon, coming on as a half-time substitute for Pierre Bouysse in a 1–3 defeat away at Montpellier. He joined Lille in the summer of 2006 and over the following seasons, he established himself as the first-choice goalkeeper for the reserve team in the Championnat de France amateur. On 27 January 2012, Oukidja joined Championnat National side Aviron Bayonnais on a six-month loan deal.

International career
Oukidja made his debut for the Algeria national team on 26 March 2019 in a friendly against Tunisia.

Personal life
Oukidja was born in France to an Algerian father from Tizi Ouzou and a French mother. He holds both French and Algerian passports.

Career statistics

International

Honours
Algeria
 Africa Cup of Nations: 2019

References

External links
 

1988 births
Living people
People from Nevers
Sportspeople from Nièvre
Algerian footballers
Algeria international footballers
French footballers
Algerian people of French descent
French sportspeople of Algerian descent
Association football goalkeepers
Expatriate footballers in Belgium
Ligue 1 players
Ligue 2 players
Championnat National players
Challenger Pro League players
FC Gueugnon players
Lille OSC players
Aviron Bayonnais FC players
Royal Excel Mouscron players
RC Strasbourg Alsace players
FC Metz players
Algerian expatriate footballers
French expatriate footballers
2019 Africa Cup of Nations players
Footballers from Bourgogne-Franche-Comté
French expatriate sportspeople in Belgium
Algerian expatriate sportspeople in Belgium